William Hartley (1868 – 15 March 1950) was an Australian politician. He was the Labor member for Kurilpa in the Legislative Assembly of Queensland from 1915 to 1918.

References

1868 births
1950 deaths
Members of the Queensland Legislative Assembly
Place of birth missing
Australian Labor Party members of the Parliament of Queensland